Njao Island is located off the northwest coast of Pemba Island, one of the two main islands of Tanzania's Zanzibar Archipelago. Together with the larger Fundo Island, which lies immediately to the south, it forms a natural barrier and breakwater for the harbour of the town of Wete, which lies seven kilometres to the southeast.

References
Finke, J. (2006) The Rough Guide to Zanzibar (2nd edition). New York: Rough Guides.

Zanzibar Archipelago
Pemba Island